The Billings Bulls were a junior ice hockey organization based in Billings, Montana. They most recently played home games at the 550-seat Centennial Ice Arena and due to the arena's small size, the Bulls frequently sold out games. They previously played their home games in the Metrapark which had a max capacity of 9,000 for hockey games. However, a negotiating dispute with arena officials and local county commissioners resulted in the team losing its lease.

History
The Bulls joined the American Frontier Hockey League in 1993 which became the America West Hockey League (AWHL) in 1998. The Bulls joined the Tier II Jr. A North American Hockey League in 2003 when the AWHL merged with the NAHL (keeping the NAHL name). The team played in the NAHL from 2003 to 2006 until the team and their rivals, the Bozeman Icedogs and Helena Bighorns, left to join the Northern Pacific Hockey League (NorPac), a regional league in the Pacific Northwest of the United States. When they joined the NorPac, the league was Tier III Junior B but promoted to Tier III Junior A by USA Hockey in 2007. In 2011, the Montana teams in the NorPac left the league to form the new regional American West Hockey League, made up of teams in Montana and Wyoming, including the Bulls. In March 2014, the new AWHL joined the North American 3 Hockey League (NA3HL) as the Frontier Division. 

On the opening weekend of the 2017–18 NA3HL season, the Bulls announced they would be going dormant due to lack of players. At the time, the Bulls were the second-oldest organization in the NA3HL, behind only the St. Louis Jr. Blues.

Previous leagues
1993–1998 American Frontier Hockey League 
1998–2003 America West Hockey League 
2003–2006 North American Hockey League
2006–2011 Northern Pacific Hockey League
2011–2014 American West Hockey League
2014–2017 North American 3 Hockey League

Season-by-season records

NHL alumni
The franchise developed a number of collegiate and professional players, but only two have played in the NHL

Chris Holt, G (University of Nebraska-Omaha, last with Braehead Clan of the EIHL), formerly of the New York Rangers and St. Louis Blues.
Brian Lee, D retired, formerly of the Tampa Bay Lightning and Ottawa Senators.

Other notable alumni with professional or major college/junior experience

Jon Booras, F (Lake Superior State University, last with MAC Budapest of the MOL Liga)
Jacob Doty, F (currently with Braehead Clan of the EIHL)
Brad Gorham, D (University of Alaska Anchorage, last with the Alaska Aces of the ECHL)
Trevor Hammer, D (University of North Dakota, last played for Florida Seals)
Jeff Hazelwood, F (last played for Las Vegas Wranglers)
Jordan Hines, F (University of Findlay, last played for Fort Worth Fire)
Dan Knapp, D (University of Nebraska-Omaha, last played for Ontario Reign)
Mathias Lange, G (last played for the Iserlohn Roosters of the Deutsche Eishockey Liga)
Tom Reimann, D (University of Maine, last played for Colorado Eagles)
Cam Strong, F (currently with Dartmouth, NCAA Division 1)
Zach Tarkir, D (Northern Michigan University, last played for IF Troja/Ljungby of the HockeyAllsvenskan)
Kevin Ulanski, C (University of Denver, last played for the Bentley Generals)
Stormy Knight, LW last played for Seattle Totems of the NPHL (current commisioner of The Mad House fantasy football league)

References

External links
 Billings Bulls website
 NA3HL Website

Sports in Billings, Montana
Ice hockey teams in Montana
American West Hockey League teams
Defunct North American Hockey League teams
1993 establishments in Montana
2017 disestablishments in Montana
Ice hockey clubs established in 1993
Ice hockey clubs disestablished in 2017